Bazancourt is the name of several communes in France:

 Bazancourt, Marne, in the Marne department
 Bazancourt, Oise, in the Oise department